Circus Angel is a 1965 French fantasy film directed and produced by Albert Lamorisse.

Plot
A burglar joins the circus to escape the police. Yet, he continues his thefts during his off-hours and gets involved in the problems of people around him, while also romancing one of the other circus performers.

Cast
 Philippe Avron as Fifi
 Pierre Collet
 Raoul Delfosse
 Georges Guéret
 Henri Lambert
 Mireille Nègre as The Girl

Awards
Wins
 1965 Cannes Film Festival: Technical Grand Prize.

Nominations
 Cannes Film Festival: Golden Palm; 1965.

References

External links
 
 

1965 films
1960s fantasy films
French black-and-white films
French children's films
Circus films
French fantasy films
1960s French-language films
Films directed by Albert Lamorisse
1960s French films